Titsey is a rural village and a civil parish on the North Downs almost wholly within the M25 London Orbital Motorway in the Tandridge District of Surrey, England.

In local government it forms the south-western part of the ward Tatsfield and Titsey and in national statistics approximates to output area E00157289. Approximately half of it land is owned by a charity running the Titsey Place estate, with the remainder being a mixture of common and privately owned woodland and smallholdings.

History
The village lay within the Tandridge hundred, of greatest use in the Anglo-Saxon Kingdom of England and it continues to form a parish in the church of England until its church became appropriated by that of Tatsfield.

The eastern parish boundary follows the London to Lewes Way Roman road which descends the escarpment of the North Downs here, crossing two important ancient east–west routes, the North Downs ridgeway and the Pilgrims Way on the lower slopes.

Titsey appears in Domesday Book of 1086 as a village: Ticesei held by Haimo the Sheriff (of Kent) when its assets were: 2 hides; 1 church, 9 ploughs, pasture worth every seventh hog of the villains. It rendered £11 per year to its feudal system overlords.

In 1929, the BBC established its radio signals receiving station in the parish of Titsey, though the facility was named after the nearby village of Tatsfield. The station's masts and shortwave aerials were a prominent local landmark. The station closed in 1974 when its work was merged with that of BBC Monitoring's receiving station at Crowsley Park in South Oxfordshire. Some derelict remains of the BBC station can still be seen.

Demography and housing

The average level of accommodation in the region composed of detached houses was 28%, the average that was apartments was 22.6%.  

The proportion of households who owned their home outright compares to the regional average of 35.1%.  The proportion who owned their home with a loan compares to the regional average of 32.5%.  The remaining % is made up of rented dwellings (plus a negligible % of households living rent-free).

In 2011 the ward of the United Kingdom, Tatsfield and Titsey, almost twice its size, had 1,816 inhabitants

Local government
The (civil) parish council clerk is David Innes.

Geography
Titsey covers a long tract which reaches up the southern escarpment of the North Downs, specifically to the highest point of the range, Botley Hill, which is in the parish. The north has altitude of around   where the North Downs Way passes through the parish. Springs in Titsey, rising at the foot of the chalk scarp of the North Downs, are the source of the River Eden.

It is a dispersed settlement bordering Farleigh to the north and the London Borough of Bromley to the north-east. Biggin Hill is to the north-east, across the village centre of Tatsfield. Titsey has two post towns depending on exact location.

References

External links

Explore Britain – Titsey Wood
Parish Council Clerk – contact details
Nore Hill Chalk Pinnacle – Surrey Wildlife Trust

Tandridge
Civil parishes in Surrey